The 1999 Slamboree was the seventh Slamboree professional wrestling pay-per-view (PPV) event produced by World Championship Wrestling (WCW). It took place on May 9, 1999 from the TWA Dome in St. Louis, Missouri. This was the last WCW PPV to be promoted with the classic logo. As of 2014 the event is available on the WWE Network.

Storylines
The event featured professional wrestling matches that involve different wrestlers from pre-existing scripted feuds and storylines. Professional wrestlers portray villains, heroes, or less distinguishable characters in the scripted events that build tension and culminate in a wrestling match or series of matches.

Event

Prior to the pay-per-view, there was one dark match, in which Dale Torborg defeated Johnny Swinger.

In the opening match of the pay-per-view broadcast, Raven and Perry Saturn won the WCW World Tag Team Championship against Rey Misterio, Jr. and Billy Kidman, and Dean Malenko and Chris Benoit in a triple threat match. Raven ultimately pinned Kidman after hitting him with the Evenflow.

Konnan defeated Stevie Ray, in the next match, via pinfall after Vincent and Horace Hogan interfered, followed by Rey Misterio, Jr. hitting Stevie Ray off the top rope.

In the following match Bam Bam Bigelow defeated Brian Knobbs. This match was advertised as a hardcore match, however immediately prior to the match it was changed to a falls count anywhere match. Knobbs attempted to dive from the crowd onto Bigelow, in the concession area. After missing, Bigelow suplexed Knobbs through the table and picked up the pinfall.

During the WCW World Television Championship title match, Rick Steiner defeated Booker T to win the title. Rick’s brother Scott Steiner came to the ring and tripped Booker T, which enabled Rick to hit a bulldog off the top rope, and pick up the pinfall.

The following match saw Gorgeous George faced referee Charles Robinson. Due to Gorgeous George’s victory in the match, Randy Savage was reinstated as a WCW wrestler.

In the next match, Scott Steiner successfully defended his WCW United States Heavyweight Championship against Buff Bagwell. Scott’s brother Rick came to the ring, indicating to Bagwell he was there to help him. As Bagwell went to his the Buff Blockbuster, Rick attacked Bagwell with a chair, enabling Scott to pick up the victory.

Roddy Piper next defeated Ric Flair via disqualification, enabling Piper to gain control as WCW President. Ric Flair was originally won this match against Roddy Piper by pinfall. Eric Bischoff came out and reversed a decision that Flair was disqualified for hitting Piper with a foreign object, turning Bischoff face for the first time since he turned on Piper and joined the nWo in November 1996. Piper fired Flair after the match.

The following match was scheduled to be between Sting and Goldberg. However, a few minutes into the match Bret Hart returned for the first time in two months, and attacked Goldberg. The Steiner Brothers then ran out and attacked both Sting and Goldberg.

In the main event Kevin Nash originally was awarded the victory over Diamond Dallas Page via disqualification. Randy Savage interfered in the match to assist Page, assaulting Nash and hitting him with the title belt. Eric Bischoff came to the ring after Savage interfered, ordered Doug Dillinger to escort Savage out of the building, and then told referee Nick Patrick to restart the match as a no disqualification match. Nash ultimately picked up the victory and the title after a Jacknife Powerbomb.

Reception
In 2021, Conrad Thompson said that the Konnan vs Stevie Ray match was "one of the worst matches" he has ever seen. Bischoff explained that, while the two of them were great stars, they did not have chemistry.

In 2016, Kevin Pantoja of 411Mania gave the event a rating of 1.5 [Extremely Horrendous], stating, "Wow, this show sucked. It got off to a decent start with a pretty fun triangle tag team match but this fell way off of a cliff after. Nothing else on the show was even able to reach two stars. There was constant interference up and down the card as well as tons of phoned in performances from many of the guys on the card. Just a classic WCW experience from this time period."

Results

References

Professional wrestling in St. Louis
1999 in Missouri
Events in St. Louis
1999
May 1999 events in the United Kingdom
1999 World Championship Wrestling pay-per-view events